Georges-Antoine-Pons Rayet (12 December 1839 – 14 June 1906) was a French astronomer.

He was born in Bordeaux, France.  He began working at the Paris Observatory in 1863.  He worked on meteorology in addition to astronomy.  He specialized in what was then the new field of spectroscopy.

He was founder and director of the Bordeaux Observatory for more than 25 years until his death. He discovered Wolf–Rayet stars together with Charles Wolf in 1867. Awarded the Janssen Medal from the French Academy of Sciences in 1891.

Obituaries
 AN 172 (1906) 111//112 (in French)
 ApJ 25 (1906) 53
 Obs 29 (1906) 332 (one paragraph)
 PASP 18 (1906) 280 (one sentence)

External links

1839 births
1906 deaths
19th-century French astronomers
École Normale Supérieure alumni
20th-century French astronomers